KBEF (104.5 FM, "Real Country 104.5") is a radio station broadcasting a Classic Country format. Licensed to Gibsland, Louisiana, United States, the station is currently owned by Minden Broadcasting, LLC and features programming from Local Radio Networks.

History
The Federal Communications Commission issued a construction permit for the station on March 9, 1998, to Northstar Enterprises, Inc. The station was assigned the KBEF call sign on May 1, 1998. On September 30, 2000, the permit was assigned by Northstar to the former owners, the Greenwood Acres Baptist Church. The station was granted its license to cover on May 23, 2001.

In 2013, Richard Chreene and Marvin Davis purchased KBEF and its sister station KASO in Minden from Robert and Mary Whitaker, the previous owners. The purchase, at a price of $260,000, was consummated on October 23, 2013.

References

External links

Radio stations in Louisiana
Country radio stations in the United States
Radio stations established in 2001
2001 establishments in Louisiana